Mohammad Reza Naseri-Yazdi is an Iranian Twelver Shia cleric who is the representative of Yazd province and the Imam of Friday in the city of Yazd, who was appointed at the mentioned positions by the decree of Iran's supreme leader, Seyyed Ali Khamenei on 28 July 2011.

Naseri-Yazdi was born in 1945 in the city of Yazd; His mother was the daughter of Qolam-Reza Yazdi (known as "Haj Sheikh QolamReza Yazdi") who was considered among the Shia scholars. When Mohammad-Reza's mother died, (then) his father decided to move to Tehran. After passing his elementary school, Mohammad-Reza's father sent his son to the mosque of Mujtahidi, to educate of seminary. Beside his education, Mohammad-Reza used to work at building of construction(s). Afterwards, he commenced to teach as well as learning on his education; Naseri-Yazdi got married in 1974 and has 5 children (4 sons, a daughter). This Shia cleric established a Hawzah in the province of Chaharmahal and Bakhtiari.

At a period of time, Naseri-Yazdi was also the representative of Vali-e-Faqih in the province of Chaharmahal and Bakhtiari and likewise the Imam of Friday Prayer in Shahr-e Kord—appointed by the decree of Seyyed Ruhollah Khomeini.

See also 
 Guardianship of the Islamic Jurist
 Imam of Friday Prayer

References 

People from Yazd
Representatives of the Supreme Leader in the Provinces of Iran
Living people
1945 births
Iranian ayatollahs